Juan Eduardo Carvajal Cerda (born 5 September 1986) is a Chilean footballer who currently plays for Deportes Copiapó in the Primera B de Chile.

External links
 
 

1986 births
Living people
Chilean footballers
Cobresal footballers
San Marcos de Arica footballers
Deportes Copiapó footballers
Chilean Primera División players
Primera B de Chile players
Association football midfielders
People from Copiapó